Kenneth Anthony Marra (born August 1, 1951) is a senior United States district judge of the United States District Court for the Southern District of Florida.

Education and career

Marra was born in 1951 in Queens, New York. He graduated from the State University of New York at Stony Brook with a Bachelor of Arts degree in 1973 and from Stetson University College of Law with a Juris Doctor in 1977.

Marra served as an attorney in the United States Department of Justice from 1977 to 1980. He went into private practice in Washington, D.C. from 1980 to 1983 and in Florida from 1984 to 1996. Marra served as a judge of the Fifteenth Judicial Circuit from 1996 to 2002.

District court service

President George W. Bush nominated Marra to the United States District Court for the Southern District of Florida on January 23, 2002, to a new seat created by 114 Stat. 2762. Marra was confirmed by the Senate by a vote of 82-0 on September 9, 2002. He received commission on September 13, 2002. He assumed senior status on August 1, 2017.

On April 7, 2015, Judge Kenneth Marra dealt with the pedophilia case involving Jeffrey Epstein. Marra ruled that sex allegations made against Prince Andrew, the British royal, in court papers filed in Florida must be struck from the public record.

References

External links
 

 Profile from the Palm Beach Bar

1951 births
Living people
Florida state court judges
People from Queens, New York
Stony Brook University alumni
Judges of the United States District Court for the Southern District of Florida
United States Department of Justice lawyers
United States district court judges appointed by George W. Bush
21st-century American judges
Stetson University College of Law alumni
20th-century American judges